Statue of Sun Yat-sen may refer to:

Statue of Sun Yat-sen (Los Angeles)
Statue of Sun Yat-sen (Melbourne), 2011
Statue of Sun Yat-sen (New York City), by Lu Chun-Hsiung and Michael Kang
Statue of Sun Yat-sen (San Francisco), 1937, by Beniamino Bufano
Statue of Sun Yat-sen (Seattle), 2018

See also
Sun Yat-sen#Cultural references